Dianne Marie Pinderhughes (born 1947) is Full Professor in the Departments of Africana Studies and Political Science at the University of Notre Dame, and former President of the American Political Science Association. Since 2021 she is the president of the International Political Science Association. She holds a B.A. from Albertus Magnus College and an M.A. and Ph.D. in Political Science from the University of Chicago. Pinderhughes sits on the editorial board of the Journal of Women, Politics & Policy. She was American Academy of Arts and Sciences Fellow of 2019.

Selected bibliography

Books

See also
 American Political Science Association

References

External links
 Dianne Pinderhughes' page at University of Notre Dame
 Dianne Pinderhughes' page at the Wilson Center 
 
 

1947 births
American women political scientists
American political scientists
Living people
Albertus Magnus College alumni
University of Chicago alumni
University of Notre Dame faculty
American women academics
21st-century American women